Robert Grace may refer to:
 Robert Grace (manufacturer)
 Robert Grace (singer)